"Breathe" is a song recorded and written by American singer-songwriter Taylor Swift featuring American singer-songwriter Colbie Caillat, taken from Swift's second studio album, Fearless (2008). Produced by Swift and Nathan Chapman, the song is driven by an acoustic guitar and mandolin and features pianos and violins in the production. Lyrically, "Breathe" addresses heartbreak and the loss of a close friendship, though some critics interpreted it as a breakup song.

Released on October 21, 2008, as a Rhapsody-exclusive, the song received favorable responses from contemporary music critics. "Breathe" was nominated for the Grammy Award for Best Pop Collaboration with Vocals in 2010. It peaked at number 87 on the US Billboard Hot 100 and was certified gold by the Recording Industry Association of America (RIAA). Swift performed the song live for the first time ever in Miami Gardens, Florida for the Reputation Stadium Tour.

Swift and Caillat released a re-recorded version, "Breathe (Taylor's Version)", as part of her 2021 re-recorded album Fearless (Taylor's Version). The re-recorded version charted on the Canadian Hot 100 and the Billboard Global 200.

Background and release

Swift was very fond of Caillat's 2007 debut album, Coco. Swift explained, "When it came out, I fell in love with the way that she makes music." Swift later contacted her management and asked if she could write a song with Caillat. They confirmed Caillat would be available due to a then upcoming concert in Nashville, Tennessee and had a day off where she could meet with Swift. According to Swift, "Breathe" is about having to depart from a someone, however, not blaming anyone. Swift believed the scenario was one of the most difficult goodbyes, "when it's nobody's fault. It just has to end." Swift explained, "It was total therapy because I came in and I was like look, 'One of my best friends, I'm gonna have to not see anymore and it's not gonna be part of what I do. It's the hardest thing to go through. It's crazy listening to the song because you would think it's about a relationship and it's really about losing a friend and having a fallout." Caillat and Swift said one of the beauties of the song was that many people would be able to relate to it because it is never specific as why the departure is occurring or whose fault it was. Caillat said in an interview that Swift "was writing about something she was going through with a band member at the time, and she was pouring her heart out about it."

Swift desired for Caillat to sing background vocals but in a loud manner, enough for audiences to recognize who sang backup. Originally Swift and Caillat were only to harmonize in the chorus, but as Caillat recorded, Swift decided to include her voice more throughout the track because of how impressed she was. Swift first recorded the entire song, and Caillat then recorded background vocals separately. Swift was very pleased with the finished product: "I think she sounds beautiful on it. I'm so excited to have her voice on my album." The song was released for digital download exclusively through Rhapsody as a promotional single on October 21, 2008, through Big Machine Records.

On the Miami Gardens, Florida, concert as part of her Reputation Stadium Tour on August 18, 2018, Swift performed "Breathe" as part of a "surprise song" for the mid-show acoustic session; she told the crowd that she was "99 percent sure" she had never performed the song live before. On February 11, 2021, Swift announced on Good Morning America that a re-recorded version of "Breathe", titled "Breathe (Taylor's Version)", would be released on April 9, 2021 as the seventh track from Fearless (Taylor's Version), the re-recorded version of Fearless. Caillat returned as the song's feature.

Composition
"Breathe" was recorded by Chad Carlson at Blackbird and Starstruck Studios in Nashville, Tennessee. It is a ballad with a length of four minutes and twenty-one seconds. It was written in common time and has a ballad tempo of 72 beats per minute. It is written in the key of D major, and Swift and Caillat's vocals span one octave, from G3 to B4. "Breathe" follows the chord progression D5–A–G. The song's instrumentation relies mainly on acoustic guitar and mandolin, which are often plucked, while, on occasion, piano and violins provide the accompaniment.

The lyrics for "Breathe" are about heartbreak and the loss of a close friendship. In the song's verses, the narrator acknowledges that people change and grow apart, though she is upset because she knows the person "like the back of her hand." In the song's refrains, she realizes the need to remain strong and breathe in order to live without the person. Ken Tucker of Billboard believed "Breathe" was a "love-gone-wrong song."

Critical reception
The song received positive responses from contemporary music critics. Ken Tucker of Billboard said the song was suited for women of different age groups. Gary Trust, also from Billboard wrote, "this ballad, perhaps along with fellow potential singles such as 'You're Not Sorry' and 'Forever & Always,' could keep Swift's string of smashes stretching into 2011." Jonathan Keefe of Slant Magazine thought Swift should have chosen another collaborator as he believed Caillat was inert. Billboards Taylor Weatherby considered the song Swift's seventh best feature. Weatherby complemented Swift's vocals, saying "she has a lovely voice that could practically sing you to sleep". He continued, describing Caillat's voice as "smooth". He concluded, "It may be the most soothing breakup song of all time."

"Breathe" was one of two songs featuring Caillat that was nominated for the Grammy Award for Best Pop Collaboration with Vocals in 2010, the other being Jason Mraz's "Lucky", the winner of the award. About "Breathe" not winning the award, Caillat said, "I love 'Breathe' with Taylor, but I've been performing 'Lucky' with Jason all around the world the last year, so I'm happy it won."

Chart performance
On the week ending November 29, 2008, "Breathe" debuted and peaked at number eighty-seven on the Billboard Hot 100, spending one week on the chart. Its appearance, along with six other songs, on the chart tied Swift with Hannah Montana (Miley Cyrus) for the female act to have the most songs charting on the Billboard Hot 100 in the same week, a record later surpassed by Swift herself when she charted eleven songs at once in 2010. It was also one of six songs to debut that tied her with Cyrus, again, for the most debuts on the chart in the same week. In 2014, the song was certified gold by the Recording Industry Association of America (RIAA).

Credits and personnel 
"Breathe"

Taylor Swift – lead vocals, producer, songwriter
Colbie Caillat – lead vocals, background vocals, harmony vocals, songwriter
Nathan Chapman – producer, acoustic guitar
Jonathan Yudkin – string arrangement, composition, performance
Chad Carlson – recording
Justin Niebank – mixing
Drew Bollman – mixing assistant
Hank Williams – mastering

"Breathe (Taylor's Version)"

 Christopher Rowe – vocals engineering, producer
 Taylor Swift – producer, lead vocals
 Lowell Reynolds – assistant engineer, additional engineer
 David Payne – recording engineer
 Derek Garten – additional engineer
 John Hanes – engineer
 Serban Ghenea – mixing
 Mike Meadows – acoustic guitar, mandolin, piano
 Paul Sidoti – acoustic guitar
 Amos Heller – bass guitar
 Matt Billingslea – electric guitar
 Jonathan Yudkin – strings
 Colbie Caillat – guest vocals

Charts

"Breathe"

"Breathe (Taylor's Version)"

Certifications

References

2000s ballads
2008 songs
Taylor Swift songs
Colbie Caillat songs
Songs written by Colbie Caillat
Songs written by Taylor Swift
Song recordings produced by Taylor Swift
Song recordings produced by Chris Rowe
Song recordings produced by Nathan Chapman (record producer)